Tamás Szalai may refer to:

 Tamás Szalai (footballer, born 1980), Hungarian footballer
 Tamás Szalai (footballer, born 1984), Hungarian footballer
 Tamas Szalai (canoeist), Hungarian canoeist